This is a list of game companies based in the United Kingdom.

Game companies in the United Kingdom

0 - 9

 22cans
 4J Studios
 505 Games

A - H

 Acid Nerve
 Activision (UK studios)
 AMA Studios
 Antimatter Games
 Big Robot
 Boss Alien (sold to NaturalMotion)
 Bossa Studios
 Bulldog Interactive
 CCP Games
 Chucklefish
 Climax Studios
 Creative Assembly
 Curve Studios
 Dambuster Studios
 Double Eleven
 Dovetail Games
 DR Studios
 Eidos Interactive (defunct)
 Beautiful Game Studios (sold to Square Enix)
 Electronic Arts (UK studios)
 Chillingo
 Codemasters
 Criterion Games
 Elite Systems
 Enlight Software
 Eutechnyx
 Facepunch Studios
 Feral Interactive
 Firebrand Games
 Firefly Studios
 Firesprite
 Fireproof Games
 Free Radical Design
 Frontier Developments
 GamelabUK
 Gameloft
 Games Workshop
 Glu Mobile
 Goldhawk Interactive
 Hanako Games
 Hello Games
 Honeyslug

I - R

 Introversion Software
 Jagex
 Just Add Water
 King
 Kuju Entertainment
 Headstrong Games
 Zoë Mode
 Kwalee
 Lucid Games
 Media Molecule
 Mediatonic
 NaturalMotion
 nDreams
 Neon Play
 Playtonic
 Positech Games
 Rebellion Developments
 Revolution Software
 Rising Star Games
 Rockstar Games (UK studios)
 Rockstar Dundee (formerly Ruffian Games)
 Rockstar Leeds (formerly Möbius Entertainment)
 Rockstar Lincoln (formerly Tarantula Studios)
 Rockstar London
 Rockstar North (formerly DMA Design)
 Runner Duck

S - Z

 SCE Worldwide (UK studios)
 London Studio
 Media Molecule
 Sega Europe
 Sports Interactive
 The Creative Assembly
 Slightly Mad Studios
 Slitherine
 AGEod
 Matrix Games
 Splash Damage
 Square Enix Europe
 Beautiful Game Studios
 Square Enix London Studios
 Stainless Games
 Sumo Digital
 Superior Software
 System 3
 Team17
 The Bitmap Brothers
 The Chinese Room
 Two Point Studios
 Ubisoft (UK studios)
 Ubisoft Leamington (formerly FreeStyleGames)
 Ubisoft Reflections (formerly Reflections Interactive)
 Virtual Playground
 VoxelStorm
 Vulcan Software
 UTV Ignition Entertainment
 Wales Interactive
 Warner Bros. Interactive Entertainment (UK studios)
 Rocksteady Studios
 Traveller's Tales
 TT Fusion
 TT Games
 Xbox Game Studios (UK studios)
 Ninja Theory
 Playground Games
 Rare
 Yippee Entertainment
 ZeniMax Europe

Defunct game companies in the United Kingdom

0 - 9

A - H

 Acclaim Cheltenham (formerly Probe Software/Probe Entertainment) (defunct)
 Acornsoft (defunct)
 Alten8 (defunct or changed name)
 Argonaut Games (defunct)
 Atomic Planet Entertainment (defunct)
 Audiogenic (defunct)
 Automata UK (defunct)
 BBC Multimedia (defunct)
 Beyond Software (defunct)
 Bizarre Creations (defunct)
 Black Legend (defunct)
 Black Rock Studio (formerly Climax Group) (defunct)
 Blitz Games Studios (defunct)
 Volatile Games (defunct)
 Bug-Byte Software Ltd. (defunct)
 Bullfrog Productions (defunct)
 CDS Software (defunct)
 Codo Technologies (defunct)
 Confounding Factor (defunct)
 CRL Group (defunct)
 Crytek UK (formerly Free Radical Design) (defunct)
 Dark Energy Digital (defunct)
 Digital Image Design (defunct)
 Domark (defunct)
 Eidos Interactive (defunct)
 Core Design (defunct)
 Pivotal Games (defunct)
 Electric Dreams Software (defunct)
 Electronic Arts (UK studios)
 EA Bright Light (defunct)
 EA UK (defunct)
 Playfish (defunct)
 Eurocom (defunct)
 FinBlade (defunct)
 Flair Software (defunct)
 Graftgold (defunct)
 Greenstreet Software (defunct)
 Gremlin Interactive (defunct)
 Headfirst Productions (defunct)
 Hewson Consultants (defunct)

I - R

 Imagine Software (defunct)
 Impressions Games (defunct)
 Incentive Software (defunct)
 Intelligent Games (defunct)
 Level 9 Computing (defunct)
 Magnetic Scrolls (defunct)
 Martech (defunct)
 Mastertronic (defunct)
 MC Lothlorien (defunct)
 Microdeal (defunct)
 Midway Studios – Newcastle (defunct)
 Mikro-Gen (defunct)
 Mythos Games (defunct)
 Ocean Software (defunct)
 Palace Software (defunct)
 Particle Systems (defunct)
 Personal Software Services (defunct)
 Pitbull Studio (defunct, merged into Epic Games UK)
 Quicksilva (defunct)
 Rage Software (defunct)
 Realtime Games Software (defunct)
 Realtime Worlds (defunct)
 Rebellion Developments
 Renegade Software (defunct)
 Rowan Software (defunct)
 Runecraft (defunct)

S - Z

 SCE Worldwide (UK studios)
 Bigbig Studios (defunct)
 Evolution Studios (defunct)
 Guerrilla Cambridge (defunct)
 Studio Liverpool (defunct) (formerly Psygnosis)
 Team Soho (defunct)
 Sensible Software (defunct)
 Software Creations (defunct)
 Software Projects (defunct)
 Studio 33 (defunct)
 Swordfish Studios (defunct)
 Talking Birds (defunct)
 Telecomsoft (defunct)
 The Assembly Line (defunct)
 THQ Digital Studios UK (defunct)
 Tiertex Design Studios (defunct)
 Twilight (defunct)
 Tynesoft (defunct)
 U.S. Gold (defunct)
 Vektor Grafix (defunct)
 Venom Games (defunct)
 Virgin Interactive (defunct)
 VIS Entertainment (defunct)
 Warthog Games (defunct)
 Xbox Game Studios (UK studios)
 Lionhead Studios (defunct)
 Zoonami (defunct)
 Zushi Games (defunct)

See also

 Lists of companies

References

External links
 Map to active game companies in the United Kingdom

Companies, United Kingdom
Video games